Harpalus lopezi is a species of ground beetle in the subfamily Harpalinae. It was described by Serrano & Lencina in 2008.

References

lopezi
Beetles described in 2008